The Autonomy Charter of Puerto Rico was, alongside the Autonomy Charter of Cuba, the first Statute of Autonomy granted in Spain to a province, in particular to the overseas province of Puerto Rico. It authorized the formation of an autonomous government.

It was granted by a Royal Decree, signed on November 25, 1897 by the Queen Regent Maria Christina of Austria on behalf of her son, Alfonso XIII of Spain. It was published in the Gaceta de Madrid on November 28, 1897.

Its promulgation was accompanied by the establishment of universal male suffrage in all overseas provinces.

Content of the Charter 
The Charter consisted of 70 articles divided into 9 titles, plus 3 additional articles and 2 transitory ones.

An Insular Parliament was established, divided into a House of Representatives (32 members elected every 5 years; 1 for every 25,000 inhabitants) and a Board of Directors (8 half-elected every 5 years and 7 for a lifetime appointment) with scope to regulate all local affairs and authority in matters of Grace and Justice, Government, Finance and Development. Meanwhile, the Spanish Courts and the executive reserved those relating to State, Navy and War. Its representative would be a Governor General, elected by the King at the proposal of the Cortes, who will exercise the Supreme Authority on behalf of the mainland. The power to legislate would correspond to the insular Chambers with the Governor General.

The insular government would be made up of five secretariats, responsible to Parliament, those of: Grace and Justice, Finance, Public Instruction, Public Works and Communications, and Agriculture, Industry and Commerce. In addition, the Provincial Council of Puerto Rico and the municipalities would remain, and the island would elect 16 deputies and 3 senators in the Spanish Courts. The Charter came into force on February 10, 1898.

End of the Autonomy Charter 
With the Treaty of Paris of December 10, 1898, the government of Spain renounced its sovereignty over Puerto Rico, handing it over to the United States, without the island institutions being consulted.

See also 
 History of Puerto Rico
 Political status of Puerto Rico
 Restoration (Spain)
 Spanish–American War

References 

History of the Caribbean

History of Puerto Rico
1897 in Spain
Statutes of Autonomy